Jorge Goncalvez may refer to:

 Jorge Gonçálvez (footballer) (born 1967), former Uruguayan footballer
 Jorge Goncalvez (racing driver) (born 1991), Venezuelan racing driver